Dharmaraja is the title of a Buddha, often mentioned in the Buddhist scriptures. For example, in the "Simile and Parable" (third) chapter of the Lotus Sutra, Shakyamuni says, "I am the Dharma King, free to do as I will with the Dharma. To bring peace and safety to living beings—that is the reason I appear in the world." Also, according to Mahayana Buddhism, each Buddha presides over his Pure Land, and hence this could explain the possible origin of the name Dharmaraja.

References

Gautama Buddha